Indian Lake is a  long,  reservoir with a southwest to northeast orientation in the towns of Indian Lake and Lake Pleasant in Hamilton County, in the Adirondack Park of New York State, in the United States. New York State Route 30 runs along the west shore of the lake. Most of the shore is part of the Forest Preserve. Indian Lake is fed by the Jessup River, and drains through the Indian River into Lake Abanakee, and from there through the Indian River to the Hudson River.

The State of New York operates a campground offering campsites in Indian Lake, most of which are on islands, that are accessible only by boat.  The campground is 12 miles south of Indian Lake village on NY 30, and is open from mid-May until Columbus Day.

The lake was made famous by the 1968 pop song "Indian Lake" performed by the Cowsills.

Tributaries and locations

Camp Island – An island located by the Indian Lakes Islands Campground. Has a campsite on the island. 
Crotched Point Island – An island located north of Camp Island. There is a campsite on the island.
Doherty Island – An island located where the Doherty Brook enters the lake. There is a campground on the island. 
Green Island – An island located south of Doherty Island. There is a campground on the island. 
John Mack Bay – A bay of the lake that is located near Moose Island.
Kirpen's Island – An island located in Norman's Cove. 
Moose Island – An island located at the mouth of the Jessup River bay. The largest island on the lake. There is a campsite on the island.
Norman's Cove – A bay of the lake located on the east shore across from Sabael.
Poplar Point – A point located between the mouths of Willow Brook and Forks Brook.

Fishing
Fish species present in the lake are brook trout, lake trout, brown trout, landlocked salmon, smallmouth bass, northern pike, lake whitefish, black bullhead, yellow perch, smelt, pumpkinseed sunfish, and white sucker. There is a state owned hard surface ramp launch in the campground off NY-30, 14 miles north of Speculator, New York. There are also boat rentals available and a marina.

Photo gallery

References

External links
New York State Department of Environmental Conservation - Indian Lake Islands Campground

Lakes of New York (state)
Adirondack Park
Protected areas of Hamilton County, New York
Lakes of Hamilton County, New York